Huallota Huachana (possibly from Quechua wallata Andean goose, wacha birth, to give birth, -na a suffix, "where the Andean goose is born") is a mountain in the Carabaya mountain range in the Andes of Peru, about  high. It is located in the Puno Region, Carabaya Province, Ayapata District, southeast of Allincapac.

References

Mountains of Peru
Mountains of Puno Region